Jerko Bulić (25 September 1924 – 11 June 2008) was a Yugoslav sprinter. He competed in the men's 4 × 400 metres relay at the 1948 Summer Olympics.

References

1924 births
2008 deaths
Athletes (track and field) at the 1948 Summer Olympics
Yugoslav male sprinters
Olympic athletes of Yugoslavia
Place of birth missing